Tison C. Street aka Curry Tison Street (born May 20, 1943 in Boston, Massachusetts) is a graduate of Harvard College ‘65 and an American composer of contemporary classical music and violinist.

He studied violin with Einar Hansen, of the Boston Symphony Orchestra, from 1951 to 1959. He later studied composition at Harvard University with Leon Kirchner and David Del Tredici, receiving B.A. and M.A. degrees. In 1973 he won the Rome Prize and spent a year at the American Academy in Rome.

His compositions have been performed by the New York Philharmonic, Los Angeles Philharmonic, the American Composers Orchestra, the Saint Paul Chamber Orchestra, the New Hampshire Symphony Orchestra, the North Carolina Symphony, and the Boston Classical Orchestra.

As a violinist, he has performed with Alea III, the Boston Classical Orchestra, the Boston Pops Esplanade Orchestra, the Harvard Chamber Orchestra, and the Boston Ballet Orchestra. He performed the violin parts for Philip Glass's Einstein on the Beach in its 1984 revival.

He has taught at Harvard University (Associate Professor of Music, 1979–1983), the University of California, Berkeley, Boston University, and Amherst College (2008).

He is a winner of a Guggenheim Fellowship (1981), a Kennedy Center Friedheim Award (second prize, 1994, for his orchestral work Bright Sambas), a Naumberg Recording Award, an American Academy and Institute of Arts and Letters Award, an NEA grant, the Brandeis University Creative Arts Award.

His works are published by G. Schirmer.

He has lived in Boston, Massachusetts, but in 2008 is living in Amherst, Massachusetts.

Here a longer biography of Tison Street:

Tison Street was born in Boston (USA) on 20 May 1943. After studying violin with Einar Hansen from 1951–59, he studied a composition with Leon Kirchner and David Del Tredici at Harvard, where he received bis B.A. in 1965 and M.A. in 1971. Among his awards and fellowships are the Naumberg Recording Award, an American Academy and Institute of Arts and Letters Award, a Guggenheim Fellowship, and N.E.A. grant, the Brandeis Creative Arts Award, a Rome Prize Fellowship, and a Friedheim Award. During the years 1979 to 1983, he was associate professor of music at Harvard. He has also taught at U.C. Berkeley and Boston University.

Tison Street's works have been performed by the Los Angeles Philharmonic, the American Composers Orchestra, the St. Paul Chamber Orchestra, the New Hampshire Symphony, and the North Carolina Symphony, and many other ensembles, as well as by such soloists as Peter Serkin and Ani Kavafian. The New York Philharmonic performed his "Adagio in E-flat for oboe and strings" in 1983, then in 1993 commissioned "Bright Sambas" for their 150th anniversary celebration. Recent projects include "Zodiac Bagatelles", and "Labyrinth for solo violin and chamber orchestra", both for the Pro Arte Chamber Orchestra, completion of "Jewel Tree", "Two Latin Anthems for mixed chorus", and a new string quartet "Round, Gigue, and Perforation". In November 2004 the Boston Classical Orchestra premiered "Symphony V: Colonial Scenes", a work co-commissioned by the Orchestra and the Koussevitzky Music Foundation, in Boston's historic Faneuil Hall.

https://www.thecrimson.com/article/1976/5/14/music-department-picks-tison-street-to/

See YouTube for video and audio clips of Street’s compositions 

He is the son of physicist Jabez Curry Street

https://en.m.wikipedia.org/wiki/J._Curry_Street

Page 347
Suggested Citation:"JABEZ CURRY STREET." National Academy of Sciences. 1997. Biographical Memoirs: V.71. Washington, DC: The National Academies Press. doi: 10.17226/5737.

His mother was Leila Fripp Tison Street

https://www.legacy.com/amp/obituaries/charleston/179499132

References

External links
Tison Street biography
Tison Street biography
G. Schirmer page

1943 births
Living people
Musicians from Boston
Harvard University alumni
American male classical composers
American classical composers
20th-century classical composers
American classical violinists
Male classical violinists
American male violinists
Amherst College faculty
20th-century American composers
Classical musicians from Massachusetts
21st-century classical violinists
20th-century American male musicians
21st-century American male musicians
21st-century American violinists